The American Ultimate Disc League (AUDL) is an ultimate disc league in North America. The AUDL was founded in 2010, and played its inaugural season in 2012 with eight teams. Regular season games are played April through July. The playoffs consist of three rounds: divisional wild card round, division championships, and finally culminating in a final four style showcase known as AUDL Championship Weekend in August. The winner of each division's championship game advances to Championship Weekend, with semifinals on Saturday and the championship game played on Sunday.

AUDL is a semi-professional league. Players do not receive a regular paycheck for playing in the league. Instead, players receive a portion of gate receipts and an ownership interest in the team. Players generally earn $350–700 per season, and generally hold full-time day jobs.

History
The AUDL was founded by Josh Moore in 2010.

Inaugural season
The first AUDL game was won by the Connecticut Constitution on April 14, 2012, over the Rhode Island Rampage by a score of 29 to 23, and the first goal was scored by Brent Anderson of the Constitution. The first championship was held on August 11, 2012, and was won by the Philadelphia Spinners by a score of 29 to 22 over the Indianapolis AlleyCats.

In the first season, the league consisted of eight teams broken into the Eastern and Western conferences. Jonathan 'Goose' Helton of the AlleyCats was named league MVP for the inaugural season. Helton, alongside Evan Boucher, Cameron Brock, Rob Dulabon, Dave Hochholter, John Korber, and Jake Rainwater were named to the first All-AUDL Team.

2012 lawsuit
In May 2012, the AUDL announced its plans for expansion for the following season, including franchises in New Jersey, New York, and Boston. Owners of the Connecticut Constitution and Rhode Island Rampage contended that the Boston and New York franchises impinged upon their Territory Licensing Agreements, which specified a non-compete radius of 100 miles. Separately, the league compensated the Philadelphia Spinners for the encroachment of the New Jersey and New York franchises. Negotiations between the Constitution, the Rampage, and the league reached an impasse in early June and the franchises' owners threatened legal action. The league preemptively sued the owners on June 17. As negotiations wore on, the league (at least twice) offered various settlements to the owners of the Constitution and the Rampage, but those offers were rejected. On July 5, the Constitution suspended team operations due to legal fees, missing two games. The league then fined the team the maximum fine of $10,000 per game, which Constitution owner Bryan Ricci called "severe and excessive" and refused to pay. Both the Constitution and Rampage had games cancelled near the end of the season. The Constitution would have earned a playoff berth but were disqualified due to their unpaid fines and the Rampage advanced in their place, losing to the Philadelphia Spinners in the Division final.

In December 2012, the league and team owners reached a settlement. Details of the settlement are unknown due to a non-disclosure agreement. Neither the Rampage nor the Connecticut Constitution returned to the AUDL in 2013.

2013–present
For the 2013 season, the Indianapolis AlleyCats and the Detroit Mechanix were the only teams from the 2012 season to remain in their cities, while the Bluegrass Revolution relocated from Lexington, KY to Cincinnati, OH and the Buffalo Hunters relocated and rebranded as the Rochester Dragons. Even with only four teams left, the league still managed to expand to twelve teams overall.

In 2014, the league expanded to 17 teams, including the introduction of the West Division. The league also reached a multi-year broadcasting deal with ESPN3 that covered 14 regular season games, a playoff game, and the Championship Weekend.

In 2015, the league expanded to 25 teams. The new expansion teams consisted of the Pittsburgh Thunderbirds, Ottawa Outlaws, Los Angeles Aviators, San Diego Growlers, Jacksonville Cannons, Nashville NightWatch, Raleigh Flyers, Atlanta Hustle and Charlotte Express. In March 2015, the Salt Lake Lions announced that they would be suspending operations for the entire 2015 season; leaving the West Conference with only 6 teams. In October 2015, the AUDL announced that the Lions franchise had been bought back by the league, making that hiatus permanent. In the same announcement, the league welcomed the Austin Sol and Dallas Roughnecks to the South Division. Shortly thereafter, the AUDL announced that the Rochester Dragons franchise was also being contracted and that the league was again hoping to start a franchise in the Boston area.

Also in 2015, the Raleigh Flyers of the AUDL signed the first ever female professional ultimate player, Jessi Jones, to play in their game against the Nashville Nightwatch. Jones, who was a team USA U-23 player in 2013, was signed as part of "Women's Ultimate Day".

In September 2016, the Cincinnati Revolution and the Charlotte Express announced they would be ceasing operations.

In the 2017 season, Jesse Shofner was selected to the roster for the Nashville Nightwatch, which made her the first female player to make a full season AUDL roster. Shofner subsequently scored two goals in the Nightwatch's first game of the 2017 season, making her the first woman to do so in any AUDL game.

Before the 2018 season, the Vancouver Riptide announced they would be leaving Vancouver.

Before the 2019 season, the Nashville Nightwatch and the San Francisco FlameThrowers announced they would be ceasing operations.

On December 4, 2019, the league announced that a new Boston franchise (later named the Boston Glory) would join the league for the 2020 season, its first expansion since 2016. That same day, the league announced a divisional realignment plan that saw the Midwest renamed the Central, the dissolution of the South into a combo South-East Atlantic Division, and the two Texas teams moving to the West division, among other moves.

The 2020 season was canceled due to the COVID-19 pandemic.

Due to COVID-related travel restrictions, in the 2021 season the three Canadian teams played in an independent series, the Canada Cup.  The 19 U.S. teams competed in three divisions: Atlantic, Central, and West. The Boston Glory and the New York Empire moved from the East Division, which did not exist in 2021, to the Atlantic Division.

In December 2021, the league announced three new franchises, the Colorado Summit, Salt Lake Shred, and Portland Nitro. With the addition of these teams the divisions were realigned, with a new South division in place of the Atlantic division. Also in December 2021, the Dallas Roughnecks announced that they were rebranding as the Dallas Legion. In February 2022, the San Jose Spiders announced a move to nearby Oakland.

After the 2022 season, the league announced the addition of the Houston Havoc, and the departure of the Tampa Bay Cannons and Ottawa Outlaws.

Rules

The AUDL features a number of rule changes from the traditional set of rules laid out and established by USA Ultimate (USAU) and the WFDF.

The field area is expanded to  yards wide and 80 yards long with 20-yard end zones (the same size as an American football field, but with the end zones taking up twice as much of the field as in American football). Games are timed with four-quarters of 12 minutes each, including a 15-minute halftime. If the score is tied, a five-minute overtime period is played. If the score remains tied after overtime, a second overtime is played in which the first team to score wins.

Notable changes from the USAU format include the use of referees, a drop in the stall count from 10 seconds to 7, a ten-yard penalty for travelling when catching the disc, no prohibition of double-teams, and a yardage penalty for travelling when throwing the disc. There are also other infractions, such as too much physicality, that result in 10- or 20-yard penalties depending on the severity of the infraction. While different from the USAU and WFDF rules, many of these changes were also seen in the MLU.

Teams
As of the 2023 season, 24 teams compete in four divisions: South, Central, East and West. There are 22 teams from the continental United States and two from Canada.

Active teams

Former teams

Championships

MVP

League Commissioners 

 Josh Moore, Commissioner from 2012 to 2013
 Steve Gordon, Commissioner from 2013 to 2018
 Steve Hall, Commissioner from 2018–present

See also 
 Major League Ultimate – defunct league which coexisted with the AUDL from 2013 to 2016
 Premier Ultimate League – women's league
 Western Ultimate League – women's league

References

External links 
 Official website

 
Ultimate (sport) competitions
Professional sports leagues in the United States
Sports leagues established in 2010
2010 establishments in the United States